Lisa Swerling (born 1972) is a South African/British artist and a New York Times Bestselling author. She is best known for her Glass Cathedrals dioramas. She is also known as co-creator of the illustrated characters Happiness Is, Harold's Planet, Vimrod and The Brainwaves.

Life

Lisa Swerling was born in Cape Town in 1972, the third of three children (born 30 seconds after her twin sister). She attended Herzlia High School in Cape Town and JFS in London. She was awarded the Shell Prize in 1991 for the second highest A-level score in Economics in the UK. She studied Philosophy and Politics at Oxford University (New College) and Art at Central St. Martins (London), after which she worked, amongst other jobs, as a painting assistant to Damien Hirst. She ran her own graphic design business Swerlybird for two years before setting up the illustration licensing company Last Lemon with her husband, Ralph Lazar.

She currently lives in San Anselmo (San Francisco Bay Area) with her family.

Glass Cathedrals

Glass Cathedrals, first introduced at an art exhibition at Spitalfields in London's East End in 2008, are glass-fronted boxes that feature scenes with hand-painted and customized miniature figures. They are showcased worldwide through art shows and galleries. Gallery representation includes MLIA at the Affordable Art Fair London (Battersea, Hampstead) and Quantum Contemporary Art. Primary markets are the US, UK and Europe.

The Los Angeles Times did a feature on Swerling's Art, showcased at the Unique LA Show in May 2011, describing it as "stealing the show".

Characters

Swerling is co-creator (partnering with her husband Ralph Lazar) of the cartoon characters Happiness Is, Harold's Planet, Vimrod and The Brainwaves.

Harold's Planet and Vimrod sell as greetings cards in the millions, and have been published by Penguin Books, HarperCollins and Andrews McMeel. The Brainwaves are cartoon characters that populate Dorling Kindersley's children's reference titles, published in over a dozen languages. Their artwork appeared weekly in The Financial Times and The Scotsman from 2006 to 2009. Happiness Is is published by Chronicle Books of San Francisco and rights have been sold in 20 languages.

With Ralph Lazar, she co-authored the book Me Without You which was on the New York Times Bestseller List in March 2015.

Awards and nominations include The Royal Society Prizes for Science Books (2008), Annecy International Animated Film Festival Grand Prix winner 1998 (International Project Competition), The Royal Society Prizes for Science Books (2007), The Washington Post Book of the Week (April 2007) and The US Parents' Choice Award 2006 and 2009.

Notes

External links
 Company website
 Glass Cathedrals
 MLIA
 Quantum

1972 births
Living people
Artists from Cape Town
South African expatriates in the United Kingdom
British writers
British sculptors
British cartoonists
Alumni of New College, Oxford
People from San Anselmo, California
Writers from Cape Town
Alumni of Herzlia High School